Edinburg Township is one of the eighteen townships of Portage County, Ohio, United States.  The 2010 census found 2,586 people in the township.

Geography
Located in the southeastern part of the county, it borders the following townships:
Charlestown Township - north
Paris Township - northeast corner
Palmyra Township - east
Deerfield Township - southeast corner
Atwater Township - south
Randolph Township - southwest corner
Rootstown Township - west
Ravenna Township - northwest corner
No municipalities are located in Edinburg Township.

Name and history
The first settlement at Edinburg was made in 1815 and the township was organized in 1819. It is named for Lewis Eddy, a pioneer settler, and was originally called "Eddysburg". It is the only Edinburg Township statewide. A post office was established at Edinburg in 1822, and remained in operation until 1903.

Government
The township is governed by a three-member board of trustees, who are elected in November of odd-numbered years to a four-year term beginning on the following January 1. Two are elected in the year after the presidential election and one is elected in the year before it. There is also an elected township fiscal officer, who serves a four-year term beginning on April 1 of the year after the election, which is held in November of the year before the presidential election. Vacancies in the fiscal officership or on the board of trustees are filled by the remaining trustees.

References

External links
County website

Townships in Portage County, Ohio
Scottish-American culture in Ohio
Populated places established in 1815
1815 establishments in Ohio
Townships in Ohio